Longing for You is an EP by German hard rock band Cacumen, released in 1985 on the independent label Boom Records. It was because of this recording that the band would finally be signed to a major recording label in 1986 and rename themselves Bonfire. In 2002/2003, Claus Lessmann and Hans Ziller purchased the rights to the Cacumen material and re-released the collection under the Bonfire name individually as well as a box set called The Early Days. This recording was part 3 of the collection, renamed to 'Down to Hell' and featured six previously unreleased recordings.

Track listing

Band members
Claus Lessmann - lead vocals
Hans Ziller - lead and rhythm guitar, talkbox
Horst Maier - lead and rhythm guitar
Robert Prskalowicz - bass
Hans Forstner - drums

Bonfire (band) albums
1985 EPs